Faces...tris III is a puzzle video game developed by Spectrum HoloByte in 1990 for the Macintosh, Amiga and MS-DOS.

Gameplay
Faces is fourth in a series after Tetris, Hatris and Welltris. In Faces, horizontal slices of two persons' faces fall side by side from the top of the screen, and the player must position them before they hit bottom. The player maneuvers the slices left and right to make faces as they stack up in piles, preferably with all the pieces from the same person's face. When the pieces stack up to the top of the screen, the game is over.

Reception
The game was reviewed in 1991 in Dragon #168 by Gregg Williams in "The Role of Computers" column. The reviewer gave the game 3 out of 5 stars.

Reviews
The Games Machine - Sep, 1990

References

External links
Faces at GameFAQs
 at MobyGames
Review Compute!
Review in Info

1990 video games
Amiga games
Classic Mac OS games
DOS games
Falling block puzzle games
Spectrum HoloByte games
Video games developed in the United States
Video games scored by Ed Bogas